Grylloblatta scudderi, also known as Scudder's rock crawler, is a species of Grylloblattidae. It was first described in 1979. It is endemic to British Columbia, Canada, and is unranked by NatureServe as of January 2021.

The first specimens were collected from Whistler Mountain in Garibaldi Provincial Park, British Columbia.

References

Grylloblattidae
Endemic fauna of Canada
Endemic fauna of British Columbia
Insects described in 1979